Jones Chapel was a church built around 1830, now demolished, that was located on East 64th Street in Manhattan, in New York City. The structure was a timber Greek Doric temple-style church with a prostyle tetra-style pedimented portico.

References 

Churches in Manhattan
19th-century churches in the United States
Greek Revival architecture in New York City
Greek Revival church buildings in New York City
Closed churches in New York City
Demolished churches in New York City
Demolished buildings and structures in Manhattan
Upper East Side